Telkari (also Romanized as Telkarī; also known as Tīlkarī) is a village in Nowjeh Mehr Rural District, Siah Rud District, Jolfa County, East Azerbaijan Province, Iran. At the 2006 census, its population was 132, in 27 families.

References 

Populated places in Jolfa County